Wando County (Wando-gun) is a county in South Jeolla Province, South Korea. It takes its name from the island of Wando, which is the largest island within the county and serves as the county seat. Wando island is perhaps most famous for Cheonghaejin, the former headquarters of Jang Bogo, a 9th-century Korean historical figure whose private fleet and army dominated the sea routes in the Yellow Sea. Wando's most famous native in modern times is champion golfer K.J. Choi.

Districts

Speciality
The best Gim is produced in the Wando area. Laver farming goes back 200 years, and with 22%, Wando is the biggest production area. In 2006, Wando exported about 2.3 million tons of green laver to the United States, Japan, and Taiwan.

Climate

Twin towns – sister cities
Wando is twinned with:

 Gangdong-gu, South Korea
 Nowon-gu, South Korea
 Yeonsu-gu, South Korea
 Cheonan, South Korea
 Rongcheng, China

See also
 Sinjido
 Saengildo
 Cheongsando - Cheongsando(Cheongsan island) is designated as a slow city.

References

External links
County government home page

 
Counties of South Jeolla Province
Port cities and towns in South Korea